Quinton Roy Ganther (born July 15, 1984) is an American football coach and former running back who is an offensive assistant for the Jacksonville Jaguars of the National Football League (NFL). He previously served as the running backs coach at Weber State University from 2014 to 2020.

Ganther played college football at The University of Utah Utes and Citrus College and was drafted by the Tennessee Titans in the seventh round of the 2006 NFL Draft. He played for five seasons in the NFL with the Titans, Washington Redskins, Seattle Seahawks, and Buffalo Bills.

Early years
Ganther played high school football at Fairfield High School.

Playing career

College
At The University of Utah, Ganther ran 1,120 yards in his senior year with a 5.5-yard-per-carry average. He added 314 yards in the air and had eight total touchdowns.

National Football League

Tennessee Titans
Ganther was selected in the seventh round of the 2006 NFL Draft by the Tennessee Titans at pick number 246 overall. He appeared in two games of the Titans in the 2006 NFL season, recording a tackle assist, and spent time on the practice squad.

Washington Redskins
On October 20, 2009, Ganther signed with the Washington Redskins. Ganther was released on November 6. On November 11, only five days after being released, Ganther re-signed with the Redskins. Ganther had his first NFL career start with the Washington Redskins against the Oakland Raiders on December 13, 2009, scoring two touchdowns, and helping the Redskins to win.

Seattle Seahawks
Ganther signed with the Seattle Seahawks on March 17, 2010. He was waived on September 28. Ganther was re-signed by the Seahawks on October 26, 2010, but was released again on November 1.

Buffalo Bills
Ganther signed with the Buffalo Bills on November 8, 2010.

Coaching career

Utah
Following the end of his playing career, Ganther began his coaching career at the University of Utah, his alma mater, as a student assistant coach under head coach Kyle Whittingham in 2012.

Seattle Seahawks
In 2013, Ganther participated in the Bill Walsh NFL diversity coaching fellowship with the Seattle Seahawks, where he assisted in coaching the running backs.

Weber State
In December 2013, Ganther joined Weber State University as their running backs coach under head coach Jay Hill.

Jacksonville Jaguars
On February 4, 2021, Ganther was hired by the Jacksonville Jaguars as the offensive quality control coach under head coach Urban Meyer.

Utah 
On January 12, 2022, Ganther returned to his alma mater Utah to be the Running backs coach under head coach Kyle Whittingham.

Personal life
While coaching at Utah, Ganther earned his bachelor’s degree in sociology from the University of Utah in 2012.

External links
 Weber State Wildcats football profile
 Utah Utes football profile
 Utah Football Names Quinton Ganther As New Running Backs Coach

1984 births
Living people
African-American coaches of American football
African-American players of American football
American football fullbacks
American football running backs
Buffalo Bills players
Coaches of American football from California
Jacksonville Jaguars coaches
Players of American football from Oakland, California
Seattle Seahawks players
Sportspeople from Richmond, California
Tennessee Titans players
Utah Utes football players
Washington Redskins players
Weber State Wildcats football coaches